The fourth and final season of Degrassi: Next Class was released on June 30, 2017 on the Family Channel App ahead of its television premiere on July 3, 2017 on Family Channel under the teen block F2N in Canada. It streamed internationally on July 7, 2017 through Netflix.

Synopsis 
Still following the same group of high school juniors and seniors from Degrassi Community School,  this season picks up during the final semester of the  school year that started in season 3. With only 3 months left in the school year, the students, both Seniors and Juniors alike, are faced with problems that will make or break them, but this time the stakes are higher. It also continues to tell stories including mental health, major depressive disorder, oppositional defiant disorder, cystic fibrosis, gender identity, sexual identity, acceptance, faith, terrorism, disabilities, sex, and  hate crimes.

Cast

Series regulars 
The fourth season has twenty-one actors receiving star billing with all twenty-one of them returning from the previous season.

Amanda Arcuri as Lola Pacini (10 episodes)
Amir Bageria as Baaz Nahir (7 episodes)
Soma Bhatia as Goldi Nahir (8 episodes)
Jamie Bloch as Yael Baron (8 episodes)
Stefan Brogren as Archie "Snake" Simpson (1 episode)
Chelsea Clark as Esme Song (9 episodes)
Reiya Downs as Shaylynn "Shay" Powers (6 episodes)
Ana Golja as Zoë Rivas (8 episodes)
Nikki Gould as Grace Cardinal (10 episodes)
Ricardo Hoyos as Zigmund "Zig" Novak (9 episodes)
Ehren Kassam as Jonah Haak (10 episodes)
André Kim as Winston "Chewy" Chu (7 episodes)
Lyle Lettau as Tristan Milligan (7 episodes)
Spencer MacPherson as Hunter Hollingsworth (9 episodes)
Eric Osborne as Miles Hollingsworth III (6 episodes)
Parham Rownaghi as Saad Al' Maliki (6 episodes)
Dante Scott as Vijay Maraj (7 episodes)
Olivia Scriven as Maya Matlin (7 episodes)
Sara Waisglass as Francesca "Frankie" Hollingsworth (9 episodes)
Richard Walters as Deon "Tiny" Bell (8 episodes)
Dalia Yegavian as Rasha Zuabi (8 episodes)

Guest stars

Alumni
Jake Epstein as Craig Manning (1 episode)
Chloe Rose as Katie Matlin (1 episode)

New students
Diya Kittur as Abra Al' Maliki (2 episodes)

Parents and faculty
Aisha Alfa as Ms. Grell (4 episodes)
Michael Brown as Mr. Blake Mitchell (2 episodes)
John Ralston as Mr. Miles Hollingsworth II (2 episodes)
Tom Melissis as Mr. Dom Perino (2 episodes)
Ashley Comeau as Ms. Badger (1 episode)
Elle Downs as Mrs. Powers (1 episode)
Janick Hébert as Madame Jean-aux (1 episode)
Nahanni Johnstone as Mrs. Milligan (1 episode)
Michael Kinney as Coach Darryl Armstrong (1 episode)
Cheri Maracle as Ms. Cardinal (1 episode)
Vijay Mehta as Mr. Nahir (1 episode)
Stephanie Moore as Mrs. Diana Hollingsworth (1 episode)
Booth Savage as Phillip Hawthorne (1 episode)

Guest stars
Charlie Gillespie as Oliver (2 episodes)

Production 
This season along with season 3 were renewed in April 2016. Production on the season officially began a month prior when casting calls for two new leads were released. Filming for season 3 & 4 were filmed simultaneously, which ended in August 2016. The season premiered on July 3, 2017, on Family Channel's 'F2N' teen block, and streamed internationally on Netflix on July 7, 2017. On F2N, it will run for two weeks and use the telenovela format. Ahead of the premiere on F2N, Family Channel released all 10 episodes on June 30, 2017, on the Family Channel App at midnight.

This season featured the first graduation for Degrassi: Next Class. Ten characters, the largest since Degrassi High, graduated in the finale of season four. These characters are: Deon "Tiny" Bell (Richard Walters), Grace Cardinal (Nikki Gould), Winston "Chewy" Chu (André Dae Kim), Jonah Haak (Ehren Kassam), Miles Hollingsworth III (Eric Osborne), Maya Matlin (Olivia Scriven), Tristan Milligan (Lyle Lettau), Goldi Nahir (Soma Bhatia), Zig Novak (Ricardo Hoyos) and Zoë Rivas (Ana Golja). The finale revealed that fellow senior Esme Song (Chelsea Clark) would not be graduating.

Episodes

References

External links 
 List of Degrassi: Next Class episodes at IMDB.

Degrassi (franchise)
2017 Canadian television seasons